Melica porteri, known as Porter's melicgrass, is a species of grass that grows in the United States and Mexico. In the US it is found in Arizona, Colorado, Kansas, New Mexico, Texas, Utah, and Iowa.

Description
The species is perennial and caespitose, which is clumped as well. The species' leaf-sheaths are tubular, scaberulous and smooth with one of their length being closed. Just like eciliate membrane, the surface of leaf-sheaths is glabrous as well.

The main panicle branches are appressed while spikelets are deflexed and solitary. Fertile spikelets are pediceled, the pedicels of which are filiform. Florets are diminished at the apex and are bisexual.

Palea have ciliolated keels and is 2-veined. Flowers are fleshy, oblong, truncate, have 2 lodicules, and grow together.

Ecology
Melica porteri can be found growing on rocky slopes, in open woods, and often near streams.

References

Further reading

porteri
Endemic flora of the United States
Flora without expected TNC conservation status